Comet is a commercial programming language designed by Brown University professor Dr. Pascal Van Hentenryck used to solve complex combinatorial optimization problems in areas such as resource allocation and scheduling.  It offers a range of optimization algorithms: from mathematical programming to constraint programming, local search algorithm and "dynamic stochastic combinatorial optimization."

Comet programs specify local search algorithms as two components: 
 a high-level model describing the applications in terms of constraints, constraint combinators, and objective functions; 
 a search procedure expressed in terms of the model at a high abstraction level. 
This approach promotes reusability across applications.

Its API allows it to be used as a software library.  Comet also features high-level abstractions for parallel and distributed computing, based on loop scheduling, interruptions, and work stealing.

References

External links
 Comet homepage at Dynadec (defunct)
 Constraint-Based Local Search by Pascal Van Hentenryck and Laurent Michel. The MIT Press, 2005.

Domain-specific programming languages